Ran Rol is an Israeli footballer currently playing for Ironi Tiberias.

Honours
Liga Leumit
Winner (1): 2013-14
Israel State Cup
Runner-up (1): 2014

References

1987 births
Living people
Israeli footballers
Hapoel Haifa F.C. players
Maccabi Ironi Kiryat Ata F.C. players
Hapoel Ironi Kiryat Shmona F.C. players
Maccabi Ahi Nazareth F.C. players
Bnei Sakhnin F.C. players
Hapoel Nof HaGalil F.C. players
Maccabi Netanya F.C. players
Hapoel Ramat Gan F.C. players
Ironi Nesher F.C. players
Maccabi Herzliya F.C. players
Hapoel Umm al-Fahm F.C. players
Nordia Jerusalem F.C. players
F.C. Tira players
Ironi Tiberias F.C. players
Liga Leumit players
Israeli Premier League players
Footballers from Karmiel
Association football midfielders